Beach volleyball will be contested at the 2011 Summer Universiade from August 13 to August 19 at the beach of Dameisha Park in Shenzhen, China. Thirty-two men's and women's teams will participate.

Medal summary

Medal table

Events

References

2011 in beach volleyball
2011 Summer Universiade events
Beach volleyball at the Summer Universiade